Souten is a 1983 Indian Hindi-language drama film directed by Saawan Kumar Tak, starring Rajesh Khanna, Tina Munim, Padmini Kolhapure, Prem Chopra and Pran. It was written by Kamleshwar, with music by Usha Khanna.  The song "Shayad Meri Shaadi" sung by Kishore Kumar and Lata Mangeshkar became especially memorable. Khanna's chemistry with Munim also proved popular. The film was remade in Kannada as Krishna Nee Begane Baro and in Telugu as Tene Manasulu. Souten was a silver jubilee hit on its release.

Plot

Movie starts with Shyam (Rajesh Khanna) standing in a court and reciting his story. Shyam is an ambitious man who meets Rukmini (Tina Munim), the daughter of a millionaire, and falls in love with her, they get married with support of Ruku's father (Pran) but her step-mother Renu and uncle, Sampatlal (step-mother's brother) try to instigate her to not marry Shyam by telling her that he doesn't loves Ruku, rather he loves Pran's money. Despite this, they get married. After marriage, Shyam's passion towards work lets Renu and Sampatlal insert themselves in their relationship. Renu instigates her to do an operation to prevent pregnancy for 5 years by telling her that pregnancy can ruin her figure, Shyam unknowingly doesn't take any precautions which results in Ruku not being able to conceive forever. Consequently, their relationship sours. Radha (Padmini Kolhapuri), the daughter of Shyam's employee, Gopal, brings hope into Shyam's life. Sampatlal convinces Ruku that Shyam is having secret affair with Radha. Ruku invites Radha and Mr. Gopal and insults her of having an affair with her husband. Mr. Pran dies giving all his property to Rukmini and Shyam and leaves nothing for Renu and Sampatlal. Shyam and Ruku get separated without divorce. Sampatlal ask Radha to marry someone else to unite Ruku and Shyam to which Radha answers positively. Soon she bears child of her husband but her husband suspects her of bearing Shyam's child. Soon it is revealed that Radha's husband has another wife and three children. After knowing this Gopal kills Radha's husband and commits suicide leaving a letter for Radha informing her that she is a widow. Shyam takes care of her and her daughter. Here the story, Shyam was reciting, ends. Sampatlal threatens to prison Shyam by next hearing. Ruku gives Shyam a photo (edited by Sampatlal) in which Shyam and Radha are shown married. Shyam finds an evidence against Renu and Sampatlal's conspiracy. Radha goes to convince Rukmini that she is not married to Shyam'  She tells that she worships Shyam and that he is like a God to her. She then consumes poison. Shaym tries to save but she tells him that that she is lucky to die at his feet. And in cremation ceremony, Rukmini is shown taking care of her child while Shyam performs her last rites.

Cast

Rajesh Khanna as Shyam Mohit
Tina Munim as Rukmini Mohit (Ruku)
Padmini Kolhapure as Radha
Pran as Raisaheb Prannath Pasha
Prem Chopra as Sampatlal
Shreeram Lagoo as Gopal
Shashikala as Renu Prannath Pasha
Paresh Rawal as Mr. Jain
Vijay Arora as Vijay
Satyendra Kapoor		
Roopesh Kumar as Bingo (Photographer)
Yunus Parvez as public prosecutor, lawyer
Sudhir Dalvi as public prosecutor, lawyer
T.P.Jain as Gunwant Lal

Production 
According to the director, Souten was the first Hindi film ever to be shot in Mauritius. Zeenat Aman and Parveen Babi were offered the role of Rukmini, but they both turned it down, leading to Tina Munim being signed.

Prior to Souten, Rajesh Khanna was not having a good run at the box office, as many of his previous films were failures. Although films like Thodisi Bewafaii (1980) did provide some respite, he could not achieve the same level of popularity he enjoyed in the early 1970s. Souten and Avtaar (1983) are believed to be the two movies which temporarily restored some of his lost stardom.

Awards 

 31st Filmfare Awards:

Nominated

 Best Supporting Actress – Padmini Kolhapure
 Best Music Director – Usha Khanna
 Best Lyricist – Saawan Kumar for "Shayad Meri Shaadi Ka Khayal"
 Best Lyricist – Saawan Kumar for "Zindagi Pyaar Ka Geet"
 Best Male Playback Singer – Kishore Kumar for "Shayad Meri Shaadi Ka Khayal"

Soundtrack
The music of this movie was composed by Usha Khanna (one of the two female music composer to have ever worked in Bollywood). 
Saawan Kumar Tak himself penned the lyrics to the famous songs.The song 'Zindagi Pyar Ka Geet Hai' of this movie is a popular one.

The song, 'Main Teri Chhoti Behna Hoon' is sampled on the Four Tet track 'Morning' on the album Morning/Evening.

The song, 'Meri Pehle Hi Tang Thi Choli' was supposed to be a duet between Lata Mangeshkar and Kishore Kumar. However, Mangeshkar refused to sing this song due to the explicit lyrics. This led to Anuradha Paudwal singing it with Kumar.

This film was a huge success of the year 1983. It was one of Rajesh Khanna's favourites.

References

Bibliography

External links
 

1983 films
Indian romantic drama films
Indian family films
1983 romantic drama films
1980s Hindi-language films
Films shot in Mauritius
Hindi films remade in other languages
Films scored by Usha Khanna
Films directed by Saawan Kumar Tak